The Chengdu Plain (Chinese: 成都平原; Pinyin: Chéngdū Píngyuán), known as Cuanxi Bazi (Chinese: 川西坝子; Sichuanese Pinyin: Cuan1xi1 Ba4zi3) in Sichuanese, is an alluvial plain located in the western part of the Sichuan Basin in southwestern China. Chengdu, the capital of Sichuan, is located at the center of it.

The plain has fertile soil and a favorable climate for rice cultivation, giving it importance in agriculture.

See also 

 Linpan in Chengdu Plain, traditional local settlement type
 Dujiangyan irrigation system

References

Plains of China
Landforms of Sichuan
Geography of Chengdu